Dennis Joseph Roberts (April 8, 1903 – June 30, 1994) was an American politician and member of the Democratic Party who served as the 63rd Governor of Rhode Island.

Biography
Born in Rhode Island's capital city, Providence, Roberts graduated La Salle Academy in 1923. He was a graduate of Fordham University in 1927 and Boston University Law School in 1930, following which he practiced law in Providence.

His political career began in 1935 when he was elected to the State Senate, where he served until 1939. He became chairman of the State Democratic Party in 1938. He was a delegate to the 1936, 1940, 1948 and 1960 Democratic National Conventions (first time as an alternate delegate).

Roberts was elected Mayor of Providence in 1940, and served until 1951, except when he served in the United States Navy during World War II. He rose to rank of lieutenant commander. He is mentioned by title in Arthur Miller's 1949 play Death of a Salesman, as the Mayor of Providence.

Governor
He was elected Governor of Rhode Island in 1950 and was re-elected three times, serving four two-year terms, holding the office from January 2, 1951 to January 6, 1959. While governor, he established a Department of Administration as a housekeeping agency for finance and other problems, as well as a Development Council to promote economic development in Rhode Island. He also reorganized the Department of Social Welfare to improve its administration. During the 1956 Gubernatorial election he lost in plurality votes to Republican Christopher Del Sesto, but the Rhode Island Supreme Court invalidated 5,000 civilian absentee and shut-in ballots cast prior to election day on the ground that a constitutional amendment required such votes to be cast on, rather than prior to, election day. This left Roberts the winner. He was defeated by Del Sesto two years later.

In 1960, former Governor Roberts sought the Democratic nomination for a U.S. Senate seat but was defeated by Claiborne Pell, who won and served in the Senate until 1997. He later went on to chair the Rhode Island Constitutional Convention, where he recommended a unicameral state legislature.

Roberts died while in surgery for a ruptured aneurysm in Rhode Island Hospital in Providence. He was a Catholic.

References

External links
NGA Biography
Political Graveyard

1903 births
1994 deaths
20th-century American lawyers
20th-century American politicians
Fordham University alumni
Boston University School of Law alumni
Rhode Island lawyers
Democratic Party governors of Rhode Island
Mayors of Providence, Rhode Island
Democratic Party Rhode Island state senators
American Roman Catholics
La Salle Academy alumni
United States Navy officers
United States Navy personnel of World War II